Dalton William Risner (born July 13, 1995) is an American football offensive guard free agent of the National Football League (NFL). He played college football at Kansas State.

Early years
Risner attended Wiggins High School in Wiggins, Colorado.

College career
Risner played at Kansas State from 2014 to 2018. During his career, he started 50 of 51 games. As a senior, he was named an All-American by numerous publications.

Professional career

Risner was drafted by the Denver Broncos in the second round (41st overall) of the 2019 NFL Draft.

Risner was named the starting left guard as a rookie and held on to the job for the next four seasons, missing four total games due to injury.

Personal life
Risner is a Christian. He married Whitney Clampitt on June 18, 2022 according to her Instagram. 

Risner created his own non-profit organization called the RisnerUp Foundation.

References

External links
Kansas State Wildcats bio
 
 RisnerUp Foundation

1995 births
Living people
Players of American football from Colorado
American football offensive tackles
Kansas State Wildcats football players
Denver Broncos players